= Garry Harrison (fiddler) =

- Born: August 16, 1954
- Died: September 24, 2012 (aged 58)
- Genres: old-time
- Occupations: builder, librarian
- Instrument: fiddle

Garry Harrison (August 16, 1954 – September 24, 2012) was a fiddle player and field recorder in Illinois. Many of the tunes he composed or collected are widely played by old-time musicians.

== Biography ==
Garry Harrison was born in Coles County, Illinois to Clifford O. and Pauline Harrison. At the age of 16 he learned to play fiddle from his father, who taught him some old-time hoedowns. His twin brother Terry began playing banjo at the same time, picking up an instrument that has been left at home by their older brother Steve when he joined the military. Harrison later taught himself how to build fiddles and other stringed instruments, and he collected and restored a large number of autoharps and fretless zithers, which he donated to the Musical Instrument Museum in Phoenix, Arizona in 2009.

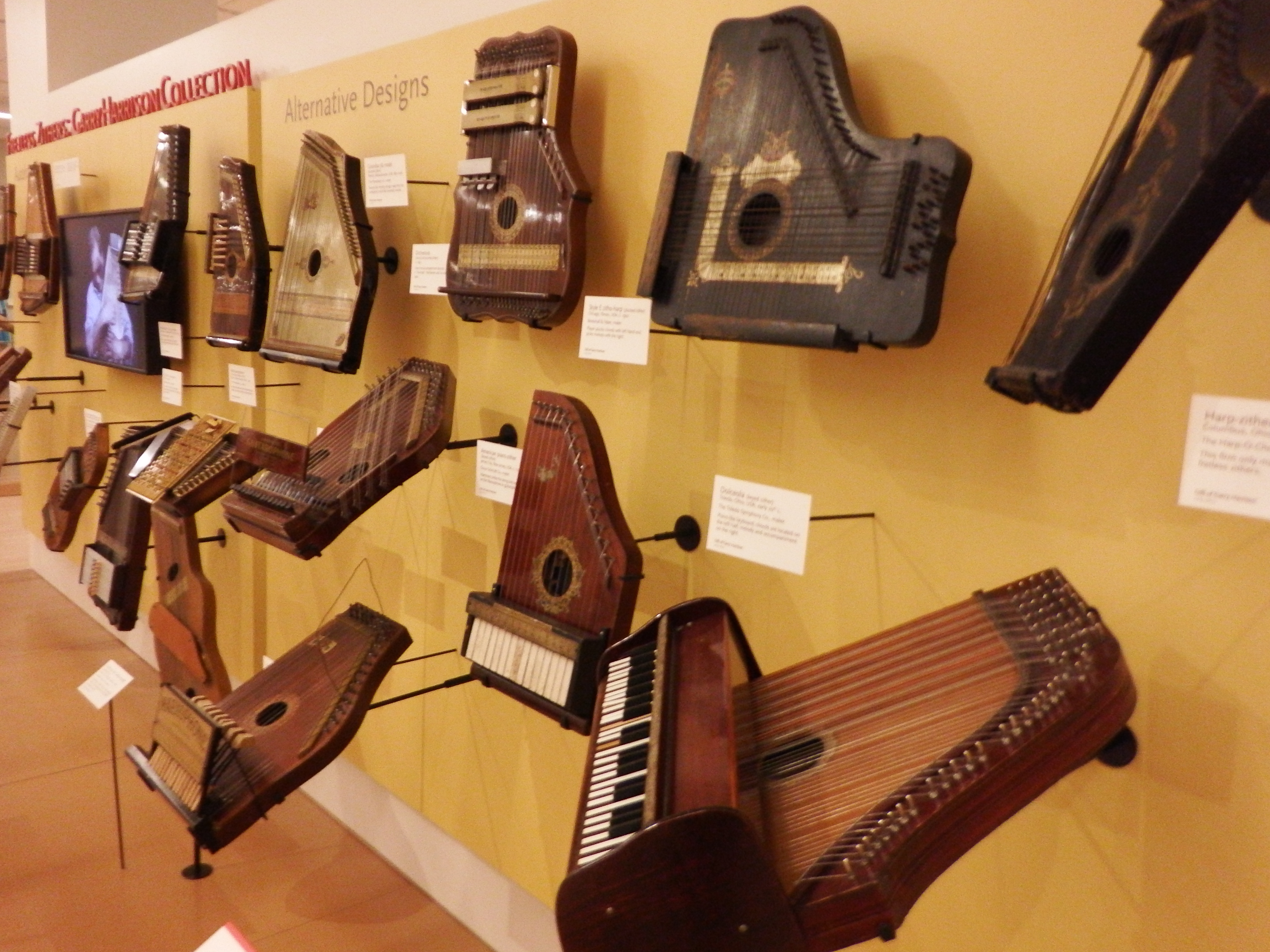
Fretless Zithers - Garry Harrison Collection - Guitar zithers, Keyed zithers (Dolceola, Marxophone), Autoharp, etc - MIM PHX

Harrison played an important role in preserving and sharing Illinois old-time fiddling. He began documenting the playing of older musicians in the 1970s. In 1976 and 1977 he and some of his musical collaborators made recordings on behalf of the Eastern Illinois University (EIU) in Charleston, and beginning in 1977 they became responsible for booking traditional musicians to appear at an EIU music festival. Recordings that Harrison and his collaborators made are now housed in archival collections at the Library of Congress and the Center for the Study of Upper Midwestern Cultures at the University of Wisconsin, among other places. Harrison also released a book of transcriptions titled Dear Old Illinois: Traditional Music of Downstate Illinois in 2007, along with a set of three compact discs containing his field recordings.

Harrison was also recognized for his own fiddling. He formed the band The Indian Creek Delta Boys with his brother Terry on banjo and a friend, John Bishop, on guitar. By 1976, the group consisted of Harrison, Lynn “Chirps” Smith, Dave Miller, and Dan Baird. In 1981, they were named the Official State of Illinois Traditional Old-Time String Band by an act of the 82nd General Assembly of the State of Illinois. A self-titled album recorded in 1977 was recently re-released by Spring Fed Records.

Harrison was a prolific composer of tunes, and his 2000 album Red Prairie Dawn, recorded with his band The Mule Team, contains a number of original tunes that have since become widely played by old-time musicians.
